Acraea sambavae is a butterfly in the family Nymphalidae. It is found on Madagascar.

Description

A. sambavae Ward is very similar to the last two species [ A. strattipocles ,  A. masamba ] , but has a more brownish red colour on the upper surface and differs especially in having the marginal band of the hindwing replaced by large black spots at the extremities of the veins; these spots touch one another at the distal margin, but are otherwise quite free; the inner margin of the hindwing broadly whitish yellow. Madagascar.

Biology 
The habitat consists of forests.

Taxonomy
It is a member of the Acraea masamba species group- but see also Pierre & Bernaud, 2014

References

External links

Images representing  Acraea sambavae at Bold.
Acraea sambavae at Pteron

Butterflies described in 1873
sambavae
Endemic fauna of Madagascar
Butterflies of Africa
Taxa named by Christopher Ward (entomologist)